Evans Owusu Nyarko  is a Ghanaian-born German football midfielder.

In 2013, he joined Borussia Dortmund II.

References

External links
 
 
 

Living people
1992 births
German sportspeople of Ghanaian descent
German footballers
Ghanaian footballers
Association football midfielders
Hamburger SV II players
Fortuna Düsseldorf II players
Fortuna Düsseldorf players
Borussia Dortmund II players
Holstein Kiel players
SV Wehen Wiesbaden players
Regionalliga players
3. Liga players
Holstein Kiel II players
FC Eintracht Norderstedt 03 players